Problepsis discophora is a moth of the family Geometridae. It is found in Korea, Taiwan and the Russian Far East.

Subspecies
Problepsis discophora discophora (Korea)
Problepsis discophora kardakoffi Prout, 1938 (Russia: Ussuri)

References

Moths described in 1887
Scopulini
Moths of Asia